Pepper Jay (née Susan Carole Jay), born May 12, 1949 in Hollywood, California is a music producer, teacher and lecturer (Life Time Teaching Credential - State of California), an actress (member of the Screen Actors Guild / AFTRA and Actors Equity), an author [Dynamic Song Performance, a Singer's Bible], and a former attorney licensed in the state of California.

Early career and education 
Pepper Jay began her performance career as a child writing and performing in playground, local theatre, and backyard plays.  She appeared in two episodes of the television sitcom,  The Real McCoys starring Walter Brennan, which premiered on ABC in 1957. After dropping out of Susan Miller Dorsey High School in Los Angeles, California, she earned her an Associate Arts degree from El Camino College in Torrance, California and an undergraduate Bachelor of Arts degree from San Diego State University. Thereafter, Pepper Jay obtained a lifetime teaching credential from the State of California. Fluent in Spanish, Jay in the 1970s taught drama, dance, Spanish, law, and health and physical education for the Los Angeles Unified School District. She was assigned to the campuses of Hollywood High School, John Muir Junior High School, and at Crenshaw High School, where she taught tap dancing and produced shows by the 100+ member drill team. She also taught school and lectured for several other school districts, including Bakersfield, CA, and San Diego, CA. Pepper Jay transitioned from her public teaching career in 1983 and earned her Juris Doctor degree from the University of San Diego School of Law. In 1985, she was admitted to the State Bar of California and went on to practice law in State and Federal Court for 32 years specializing in representing trustees and creditors in breach of contract and fraud litigation.  During this time, Pepper Jay was a member of the Wilshire Bar Association and President of that Association for 3 years.

Career in entertainment and journalism 
In 1990, Pepper Jay established the entertainment company, Pepper Jay Productions, LLC. She created the  Working Actors Group, where, from 1993 through 2010, she and teaching partner John Michael Ferrari offered on-camera and cold-reading workshops to selected union actors.  Pepper Jay continues today to coach performance skills for singers, actors, teachers, lawyers, students, and speakers.

Pepper Jay's performance students include Allison Iraheta (American Idol, Season 8, Top 4), Stevie Wright (Season 8, Top 36), Nikki Nova (Taiwan Idol, 2010, Top 10), Liquid Blue (Pop Album of the Year, Los Angeles Music Awards), Gisell (Winner: Talentos Premios), teen opera singer Golda Berkman, and hip hop dancer and singer, Montana Tucker.

In 2008 Pepper Jay Productions created the Actors Podcast Network and its first channel Actors Reporter online|Actors Reporter and in 2009 her company established a second channel Actors Entertainment, which consists of 12 internet and cable shows, including ActorsE Chat, Models Best Friend, Sidebeat Music, and Tinsel on the Town.

Pepper Jay is the author of "Dynamic Song Performance, The Singer's Bible," available on Amazon, with contributions by John Michael Ferrari, preface by Allison Iraheta, and photographs by John Michael Ferrari, Jeff Knight, and John Wright.

Pepper Jay was honored by the Multicultural Motion Picture Association with the Diamond Rose Award in Entertainment (2016).  Pepper is also an American Ambassador for Arts 4 Peace Awards (2015), and traveled to Lagos, Nigeria on behalf of that organization.

Pepper Jay was awarded the Dr. Dante Sears’ Heartpreneur of the Year Legend Award (2020) by the eZWay Network Virtual Wall of Fame Awards.

Pepper Jay's keynote speaking, teaching, acting and music producing career continues.

Musical career 
Pepper Jay has produced music for more than 30 years with her performing singer songwriter recording artist partner, John Michael Ferrari.  Their latest project is the album, “Be the Smile on Your Face“ (2020) with storytelling country crossover songs written by Ferrari and produced by Pepper Jay. Their first endeavor together was the album, “My Early Life” (2018), featuring songs written by Ferrari over the past five decades.   Several  of Ferrari’s singles have been released since the early 90s, including “bad dreams“ and “sentimental fool I keep dreaming.”
From 1990 through 2010, Pepper Jay produced live entertainment with John Michael Ferrari’s former band, “Ferrari & Friends,” with John Michael Ferrari, Thurston Watts, Mack Doughtery, Pat Zicara, Katie Jensen, Norman A. Norman, Russell Watts, Al Boyd, Kenyatta Mackey, Al Vescovo, and Allison Iraheta.
From 2015 through the present, Pepper Jay produces live entertainment with The John Michael Ferrari Bands, one from Las Vegas, Nevada, and the other from Nashville, Tennessee.
Pepper Jay Productions is a music publisher, under the record label Cappy Records, and is a member of the American Society of Composers, Authors and Publishers.  
An early recording collaboration with John Michael Ferrari resulted in Ferrari's first album, "My Early Life," produced by Pepper Jay and mastered by George Velmer and John Vestman, for Pepper Jay Productions on the Cappy Records Label (1990). This album contains Ferrari's earliest songs, When Love Said Good-Bye, Ain’t No Mistaken, Brand New River, Breaking Up Inside, Dustoff, Let's Run Away to Alaska, Run, Sentimental Fool, That's What You Do, Why'd Momma Lie, and When Love Said Good-Bye Instrumental. "John Michael Ferrari’s My Early Life is a Tribute to His Eventful Past" [15]
Pepper Jay's most recent collaboration with John Michael Ferrari is his album, "Be the Smile on Your Face" also under the independent label, Cappy Records  (2020). This album contains Ferrari's most recent song creations, Be the Smile on Your Face, Don't Need a Reason, I Don't Want to Love, If We Could Be Lovers, Keep Falling All Over Myself, Nowhere to LA, Peggy Sues, So Beautiful, Somewhere We Could Fall, What Are You Doing, Who Can Blame a Broken Heart, and You Should Be Winning
The single off the "Be the Smile on Your Face" album, "So Beautiful", is climbing several country and adult contemporary radio charts.

Pepper Jay produced “Like a Rock and Roll Band,” a let’s-all-get-together-in-love-and-harmony” song which was awarded “Peace Song of the Year 2020” at the Tribute to the Oscars Gala by the Art 4 Peace Awards. The album "Be the Smile on Your Face" by John Michael Ferrari was awarded Triple A Album of the Year 2020 by the Producers Choice Honors.

Discography

Studio albums
 My Early Life,  John Michael Ferrari (1990)
 Be the Smile on Your Face,  John Michael Ferrari (2020)

Singles
 Dustoff,  John Michael Ferrari (2011)
 Let’s Run Away to Alaska,  John Michael Ferrari (2011)
 Don’t Fall Between the Daylight,  John Michael Ferrari (2011)
 Why’d Momma Lie?,  John Michael Ferrari (2018)
 Sentimental Fool I Keep Dreaming,  John Michael Ferrari (2019)
 Bad Dream,  John Michael Ferrari (2020)
 Keep Falling All Over Myself,  John Michael Ferrari (2020)
 The Son Don’t Lie,  John Michael Ferrari (2020)
 My Heart Can't Breathe,  John Michael Ferrari (2021)

References

External links 
 
 "About Us" at ActorsReporter.com
  PepperJay.com
 Dynamic Song Performance

1949 births
Living people
American women journalists
21st-century American women